Turricula navarchus is a species of sea snail, a marine gastropod mollusk in the family Clavatulidae.

Description
The length of the shell attains 64 mm, its diameter 18 mm.

The solid, fusiform shell contains 13 whorls of which two are in the protoconch. The shell is remarkable for its regular beaded spiral zone just below the sutures of each whorl, above which are two spiral clearly-cut grooves, the middle of the upper whorls being most beautifully obliquely costulate. The costae are terminated above by a double sulcus surrounding a narrow spiral lira. The body whorl, equalling the others in size, is almost entirely grooved and spirally lirate.  The liree below are rufous-spotted. The outer lip is thin, perhaps not quite fully developed. The sinus is well marked but not deep. The columella is somewhat straight. The siphonal canal is broad and rather prolonged.

Distribution
This marine species occurs in the Persian Gulf and the Gulf of Oman.

References

External links

 Barnard K.H. (1958), Contribution to the knowledge of South African marine Mollusca. Part 1. Gastropoda; Prosobranchiata: Toxoglossa; Annals of The South African Museum v. 44 p. 73–163

navarchus
Gastropods described in 1903